Mehmet Talat may refer to:
Mehmet Talaat Pasha, one of the Three Pashas of the Ottoman Empire
Mehmet Ali Talat, Northern Cypriot politician